Aphonopelma braunshausenii is a species of spiders in the family Theraphosidae, found in Mexico.

References

braunshausenii
Spiders described in 1996
Spiders of Mexico